The Ten Commandments (Biblical Hebrew עשרת הדברים \ עֲשֶׂרֶת הַדְּבָרִים, aséret ha-dvarím, lit. The Decalogue, The Ten Words, cf. Mishnaic Hebrew עשרת הדיברות \ עֲשֶׂרֶת הַדִּבְּרוֹת, aséret ha-dibrót, lit. The Decalogue, The Ten Sayings, The Ten Utterances) are a set of biblical principles relating to ethics and worship that play a fundamental role in Judaism and Christianity. The text of the Ten Commandments appears twice in the Hebrew Bible: at Exodus  and Deuteronomy .

According to the Book of Exodus in the Torah, the Ten Commandments were revealed to Moses at Mount Sinai and inscribed by the finger of God on two tablets of stone kept in the Ark of the Covenant.

Scholars disagree about when the Ten Commandments were written and by whom, with some modern scholars suggesting that they were likely modeled on Hittite and Mesopotamian laws and treaties.

Terminology

The Ten Commandments, called  (transliterated ) in Biblical Hebrew, are mentioned at Exodus , Deuteronomy  and Deuteronomy . In all sources, the terms are translatable as "the ten words", "the ten sayings", or "the ten matters".

In English this is sometimes rendered as "Decalogue", providing an alternative name for the Ten Commandments. The Tyndale and Coverdale English biblical translations used "nine verses". The Geneva Bible used "ten commandments", which was followed by the Bishops' Bible and the Authorized Version (the "King James" version) as "ten commandments". Most major English versions use the word "commandments".

The stone tablets, as opposed to the ten commandments inscribed on them, are called , Lukhot HaBrit, meaning "the tablets of the covenant".

Biblical narrative

The biblical narrative of the revelation at Sinai begins in Exodus 19 after the arrival of the children of Israel at Mount Sinai (also called Horeb). On the morning of the third day of their encampment, "there were thunders and lightnings, and a thick cloud upon the mount, and the voice of the trumpet exceeding loud", and the people assembled at the base of the mount. After "the  came down upon mount Sinai", Moses went up briefly and returned to prepare the people, and then in Exodus 20 "God spoke" to all the people the words of the covenant, that is, the "ten commandments" as it is written.  Modern biblical scholarship differs as to whether  describes the people of Israel as having directly heard all or some of the decalogue, or whether the laws are only passed to them through Moses.

The people were afraid to hear more and moved "afar off", and Moses responded with "Fear not." Nevertheless, he drew near the "thick darkness" where "the presence of the Lord" was to hear the additional statutes and "judgments", all which he "wrote" in the "book of the covenant" which he read to the people the next morning, and they agreed to be obedient and do all that the  had said. Moses escorted a select group consisting of Aaron, Nadab and Abihu, and "seventy of the elders of Israel" to a location on the mount where they worshipped "afar off" and they "saw the God of Israel" above a "paved work" like clear sapphire stone.

The mount was covered by the cloud for six days, and on the seventh day Moses went into the midst of the cloud and was "in the mount forty days and forty nights." And Moses said, "the  delivered unto me two tablets of stone written with the finger of God; and on them was written according to all the words, which the  spake with you in the mount out of the midst of the fire in the day of the assembly." Before the full forty days expired, the children of Israel collectively decided that something had happened to Moses, and compelled Aaron to fashion a golden calf, and he "built an altar before it" and the people "worshipped" the calf.

After the full forty days, Moses and Joshua came down from the mountain with the tablets of stone: "And it came to pass, as soon as he came nigh unto the camp, that he saw the calf, and the dancing: and Moses' anger waxed hot, and he cast the tablets out of his hands, and break them beneath the mount." After the events in chapters 32 and 33, the  told Moses, "Hew thee two tablets of stone like unto the first: and I will write upon these tablets the words that were in the first tablets, which thou breakest." "And he wrote on the tablets, according to the first writing, the ten commandments, which the  spake unto you in the mount out of the midst of the fire in the day of the assembly: and the  gave them unto me." These tablets were later placed in the ark of the covenant.

Numbering

Religious traditions 
Although both the Masoretic Text and the Dead Sea Scrolls have the passages of Exodus 20 and Deuteronomy 5 divided into ten specific commandments formatted with space between them corresponding to the Lutheran counting in the chart below, many Modern English Bible translations give the appearance of more than ten imperative statements in each passage.

Some suggest that the number ten is a choice to aid memorization rather than a matter of theology.

Categorization 

There are two major approaches to categorizing the commandments. One approach distinguishes the prohibition against other gods (verse 3) from the prohibition against images (verses 4–6):

 LXX: Septuagint (3rd century BC), generally followed by Eastern Orthodox Christians.
 P: Philo (1st century), has an extensive homily explaining the order, with the prohibition on adultery "the greatest of the commands dealing with persons", followed by the prohibitions against stealing and then killing.
 R: Reformed Christians follow Calvin's Institutes (1536) follows the Septuagint; this system is also in the Anglican Book of Common Prayer.

Another approach combines verses 3–6, the prohibition against images and the prohibition against other gods, into a single command while still maintaining ten commandments. Samaritan and Jewish traditions include another commandment, whereas Christian traditions will divide coveting the neighbor's wife and house.

 T: Jewish Talmud, makes the "prologue" the first "saying" or "matter."
 S: Samaritan Pentateuch, contains additional instruction to Moses about making a sacrifice to Yahweh, which Samaritans regard as the 10th commandment.
 A: Augustine (4th century), follows the Talmud in combining verses 3–6, but omits the prologue as a commandment and divides the prohibition on coveting into two commandments, following the word order of Deuteronomy 5:21 rather than Exodus 20:17. 
 C: Roman Catholicism largely follows Augustine, which was reiterated in the Catechism of the Catholic Church (1992) changing "the sabbath" into "the lord's day" and dividing Exodus 20:17, prohibiting covetousness, into two commandments.
 L: Lutherans follow Luther's Large Catechism (1529), which follows Augustine and Roman Catholic tradition but subordinates the prohibition of images to the sovereignty of God in the First Commandment and uses the word order of Exodus 20:17 rather than Deuteronomy 5:21 for the ninth and tenth commandments.

Religious interpretations
The Ten Commandments concern matters of fundamental importance in Judaism and Christianity: the greatest obligation (to worship only God), the greatest injury to a person (murder), the greatest injury to family bonds (adultery), the greatest injury to commerce and law (bearing false witness), the greatest inter-generational obligation (honour to parents), the greatest obligation to community (truthfulness), the greatest injury to movable property (theft).

The Ten Commandments are written with room for varying interpretation, reflecting their role as a summary of fundamental principles. They are not as explicit or as detailed as rules or as many other biblical laws and commandments, because they provide guiding principles that apply universally, across changing circumstances. They do not specify punishments for their violation. Their precise import must be worked out in each separate situation.

The Bible indicates the special status of the Ten Commandments among all other Torah laws in several ways:
 They have a uniquely terse style.
 Of all the biblical laws and commandments, the Ten Commandments alone are said to have been "written with the finger of God". 
 The stone tablets were placed in the Ark of the Covenant.

Judaism

The Ten Commandments form the basis of Jewish law, stating God's universal and timeless standard of right and wrong – unlike the rest of the 613 commandments in the Torah, which include, for example, various duties and ceremonies such as the kashrut dietary laws, and the rituals to be performed by priests in the Holy Temple. Jewish tradition considers the Ten Commandments the theological basis for the rest of the commandments. Philo, in his four-book work The Special Laws, treated the Ten Commandments as headings under which he discussed other related commandments. Similarly, in The Decalogue he stated that "under [the "commandment… against adulterers"] many other commands are conveyed by implication, such as that against seducers, that against practisers of unnatural crimes, that against all who live in debauchery, that against all men who indulge in illicit and incontinent connections." Others, such as Rabbi Saadia Gaon, have also made groupings of the commandments according to their links with the Ten Commandments.

According to Conservative Rabbi Louis Ginzberg, Ten Commandments are virtually entwined, in that the breaking of one leads to the breaking of another. Echoing an earlier rabbinic comment found in the commentary of Rashi to the Songs of Songs (4:5) Ginzberg explained—there is also a great bond of union between the first five commandments and the last five. The first commandment: "I am the Lord, thy God," corresponds to the sixth: "Thou shalt not kill," for the murderer slays the image of God. The second: "Thou shalt have no strange gods before me," corresponds to the seventh: "Thou shalt not commit adultery," for conjugal faithlessness is as grave a sin as idolatry, which is faithlessness to God. The third commandment: "Thou shalt not take the name of the Lord in vain," corresponds to the eighth: "Thou shalt not steal," for stealing results in a false oath in God's name. The fourth: "Remember the Sabbath day, to keep it holy," corresponds to the ninth: "Thou shalt not bear false witness against thy neighbor," for he who bears false witness against his neighbor commits as grave a sin as if he had borne false witness against God, saying that He had not created the world in six days and rested on the seventh day (the holy Sabbath). The fifth commandment: "Honor thy father and thy mother," corresponds to the tenth: "Covet not thy neighbor's wife," for one who indulges this lust produces children who will not honor their true father, but will consider a stranger their father.

The traditional Rabbinical Jewish belief is that the observance of these commandments and the other mitzvot are required solely of the Jewish people and that the laws incumbent on humanity in general are outlined in the seven Noahide laws, several of which overlap with the Ten Commandments. In the era of the Sanhedrin transgressing any one of six of the Ten Commandments theoretically carried the death penalty, the exceptions being the First Commandment, honouring your father and mother, saying God's name in vain, and coveting, though this was rarely enforced due to a large number of stringent evidentiary requirements imposed by the oral law.

Two tablets

The arrangement of the commandments on the two tablets is interpreted in different ways in the classical Jewish tradition. Rabbi Hanina ben Gamaliel says that each tablet contained five commandments, "but the Sages say ten on one tablet and ten on the other", that is, that the tablets were duplicates. This can be compared to diplomatic treaties of the ancient Near East, in which a copy was made for each party.

According to the Talmud, the compendium of traditional Rabbinic Jewish law, tradition, and interpretation, one interpretation of the biblical verse "the tablets were written on both their sides", is that the carving went through the full thickness of the tablets, yet was miraculously legible from both sides.

Use in Jewish ritual

The Mishna records that during the period of the Second Temple, the Ten Commandments were recited daily, before the reading of the Shema Yisrael (as preserved, for example, in the Nash Papyrus, a Hebrew manuscript fragment from 150 to 100 BC found in Egypt, containing a version of the ten commandments and the beginning of the Shema); but that this practice was abolished in the synagogues so as not to give ammunition to heretics who claimed that they were the only important part of Jewish law, or to dispel a claim by early Christians that only the Ten Commandments were handed down at Mount Sinai rather than the whole Torah.

In later centuries rabbis continued to omit the Ten Commandments from daily liturgy in order to prevent confusion among Jews that they are only bound by the Ten Commandments, and not also by many other biblical and Talmudic laws, such as the requirement to observe holy days other than the sabbath.

Today, the Ten Commandments are heard in the synagogue three times a year: as they come up during the readings of Exodus and Deuteronomy, and during the festival of Shavuot. The Exodus version is read in parashat Yitro around late January–February, and on the festival of Shavuot, and the Deuteronomy version in parashat Va'etchanan in August–September. In some traditions, worshipers rise for the reading of the Ten Commandments to highlight their special significance though many rabbis, including Maimonides, have opposed this custom since one may come to think that the Ten Commandments are more important than the rest of the Mitzvot.

In printed Chumashim, as well as in those in manuscript form, the Ten Commandments carry two sets of cantillation marks. The ta'am 'elyon (upper accentuation), which makes each Commandment into a separate verse, is used for public Torah reading, while the ta'am tachton (lower accentuation), which divides the text into verses of more even length, is used for private reading or study. The verse numbering in Jewish Bibles follows the ta'am tachton.

Samaritan
The Samaritan Pentateuch varies in the Ten Commandments passages, both in that the Samaritan Deuteronomical version of the passage is much closer to that in Exodus, and in that Samaritans count as nine commandments what others count as ten. The Samaritan tenth commandment is on the sanctity of Mount Gerizim.

The text of the Samaritan tenth commandment follows:

Christianity

Most traditions of Christianity hold that the Ten Commandments have divine authority and continue to be valid, though they have different interpretations and uses of them. The Apostolic Constitutions, which implore believers to "always remember the ten commands of God," reveal the importance of the Decalogue in the early Church. Through most of Christian history the decalogue was considered a summary of God's law and standard of behaviour, central to Christian life, piety, and worship.

Distinctions in the order and importance of said order continues to be a theological debate, with texts within the New Testament  confirming the more traditional ordering, which follows the Septuagint of adultery, murder and theft; as opposed to the currently held order of the Masoretic of murder, adultery, theft.

References in the New Testament

During his Sermon on the Mount, Jesus explicitly referenced the prohibitions against murder and adultery. In  Jesus repeated five of the Ten Commandments, followed by that commandment called "the second" after the first and great commandment.

In his Epistle to the Romans, Paul the Apostle also mentioned five of the Ten Commandments and associated them with the neighbourly love commandment.

Catholicism

In Catholicism, Jesus freed Christians from the rest of Jewish religious law, but not from their obligation to keep the Ten Commandments. It has been said that they are to the moral order what the creation story is to the natural order.

According to the Catechism of the Catholic Church—the official exposition of the Catholic Church's Christian beliefs—the Commandments are considered essential for spiritual good health and growth, and serve as the basis for social justice. Church teaching of the Commandments is largely based on the Old and New Testaments and the writings of the early Church Fathers. In the New Testament, Jesus acknowledged their validity and instructed his disciples to go further, demanding a righteousness exceeding that of the scribes and Pharisees. Summarized by Jesus into two "great commandments" that teach the love of God and love of neighbour, they instruct individuals on their relationships with both.

The great commandments contain the Law of the Gospel, summed up in the Golden Rule. The Law of the Gospel is expressed particularly in the Sermon on the Mount. The Catechism of the Catholic Church explains that, "the Law of the Gospel fulfills the commandments of the Law. The Lord’s Sermon on the Mount, far from abolishing or devaluing the moral prescriptions of the Old Law, releases their hidden potential and has new demands arise from them: it reveals their entire devine and human truth. It does not add new external precepts, but proceeds to reform the heart, the root of human acts, where man chooses between the pure and the impure, where faith, hope, and charity are formed and with them the other virtues." The New Law "fulfills, refines, surpasses, and leads the Old Law to its perfection."

Orthodox

The Eastern Orthodox Church holds its moral truths to be chiefly contained in the Ten Commandments. A confession begins with the Confessor reciting the Ten Commandments and asking the penitent which of them he has broken.

Protestantism

After rejecting the moral theology of Roman Catholicism, giving more importance to biblical law and the gospel, early Protestant theologians continued to take the Ten Commandments as the starting point of Christian moral life. Different versions of Christianity have varied in how they have translated the bare principles into the specifics that make up a full Christian ethic.

Lutheranism

The Lutheran division of the commandments follows the one established by St. Augustine, following the then current synagogue scribal division. The first three commandments govern the relationship between God and humans, the fourth through eighth govern public relationships between people, and the last two govern private thoughts. See Luther's Small Catechism and Large Catechism.

Reformed
The Articles of the Church of England, Revised and altered by the Assembly of Divines, at Westminster, in the year 1643 state that "no Christian man whatsoever is free from the obedience of the commandments which are called moral. By the moral law, we understand all the Ten Commandments taken in their full extent." The Westminster Confession, held by Presbyterian Churches, holds that the moral law contained in the Ten Commandments "does forever bind all, as well justified persons as others, to the obedience thereof".

Methodist
The moral law contained in the Ten Commandments, according to the founder of the Methodist movement John Wesley, was instituted from the beginning of the world and is written on the hearts of all people.
As with the Reformed view, Wesley held that the moral law, which is contained in the Ten Commandments, stands today:

In keeping with Wesleyan covenant theology, "while the ceremonial law was abolished in Christ and the whole Mosaic dispensation itself was concluded upon the appearance of Christ, the moral law remains a vital component of the covenant of grace, having Christ as its perfecting end." As such, in Methodism, an "important aspect of the pursuit of sanctification is the careful following" of the Ten Commandments.

Baptist
The Ten Commandments are a summary of the requirements of a works covenant (called the "Old Covenant"), given on Mount Sinai to the nascent nation of Israel. The Old Covenant is fulfilled by Christ at the cross. Unbelievers are still under the Law.  The law reveals man's sin and need for the salvation that is Jeshua.  Repentance from sin and faith in Christ for salvation is the point of the entire Bible. They do reflect the eternal character of God, and serve as a paragon of morality.

The Church of Jesus Christ of Latter-day Saints
According to the doctrine of the Church of Jesus Christ of Latter-day Saints, Jesus completed rather than rejected the Mosaic law. The Ten Commandments are considered eternal gospel principles necessary for exaltation. They appear in the Book of Mosiah 12:34–36, 13:15–16, 13:21–24 and Doctrine and Covenants. According to the Book of Mosiah, a prophet named Abinadi taught the Ten Commandments in the court of King Noah and was martyred for his righteousness. Abinadi knew the Ten Commandments from the brass plates.

In an October 2011 address, the Church president and prophet Thomas S. Monson taught "The Ten Commandments are just that—commandments. They are not suggestions." In that same talk he used small quotations listing the numbering and selection of the commandments. This and other sources don't include the prologue, making it most consistent with the Septuagint numbering.

A splinter group of the Church called the "Church of Jesus Christ of Latter Day Saints (Strangite)" have a belief similar to the Samaritans where they have the entire Ten Commandments in their scripture where others only have nine. The Strangite fourth Commandment is "Thou shalt love thy neighbor as thyself." The Strangite's founder and namesake James Strang wrote in  "Note on the Decalogue" as part of the Book of the Law of the Lord (a Strangite holy book) that no other version of the Decalogue contains more than nine commandments and speculated that his fourth Commandment was omitted from other works perhaps as early as Josephus' time (circa 37-100 AD).

Islam

Moses and the Tablets

The receiving of the Ten Commandments by Prophet Musa (Moses) is dealt with in much detail in Islamic tradition with the meeting of Moses with God on Mount Sinai described in Surah A'raf (7:142-145). The Revealing of the Tablets on which were the Commandments of God is described in the following verse:

The Tablets are further alluded to in verses 7:150, when Moses threw the Tablets down in anger at seeing the Israelites' worshipping of the golden calf, and in 7:154 when he picked up the Tablets having recovered from his anger:

Classical views
Three verses of Surah An'am (6:151–153) are widely taken to be a reinstatement (or revised version) of the Ten Commandments either as revealed to Moses originally or as they are to be taken by Muslims now:

Evidence for these verses having some relation to Moses and the Ten Commandments is from the verse which immediately follows them:

According to a narration in Mustadrak Hakim, Ibn Abbas, a prominent narrator of Israiliyat traditions said, "In Surah Al-An`am, there are clear Ayat, and they are the Mother of the Book (the Qur'an)." He then recited the above verses.

Also in Mustadrak Hakim is the narration of Ubada ibn as-Samit:

Ibn Kathir mentions a narration of Abdullah ibn Mas'ud in his Tafsir:

Other views

Main points of interpretative difference

Sabbath day

The Abrahamic religions observe the Sabbath in various ways. In Judaism it is observed on Saturday (reckoned from dusk to dusk). In Christianity, it is sometimes observed on Saturday, sometimes on Sunday, and sometimes not at all (non-Sabbatarianism). Observing the Sabbath on Sunday, the day of resurrection, gradually became the dominant Christian practice from the Jewish-Roman wars onward. The Church's general repudiation of Jewish practices during this period is apparent in the Council of Laodicea (4th century AD) where Canons 37–38 state: "It is not lawful to receive portions sent from the feasts of Jews or heretics, nor to feast together with them" and "It is not lawful to receive unleavened bread from the Jews, nor to be partakers of their impiety". Canon 29 of the Laodicean council specifically refers to the sabbath: "Christians must not judaize by resting on the [Jewish] Sabbath, but must work on that day, rather honouring the Lord's Day; and, if they can, resting then as Christians. But if any shall be found to be judaizers, let them be anathema from Christ."

Killing or murder

Multiple translations exist of the fifth/sixth commandment; the Hebrew words  (lo tirtzach) are variously translated as "thou shalt not kill" or "thou shalt not murder".

The imperative is against unlawful killing resulting in bloodguilt. The Hebrew Bible contains numerous prohibitions against unlawful killing, but does not prohibit killing in the context of warfare, capital punishment or a home invasion during the night, which are considered justified. The New Testament is in agreement that murder is a grave moral evil, and references the Old Testament view of bloodguilt.

Theft

German Old Testament scholar Albrecht Alt: Das Verbot des Diebstahls im Dekalog (1953), suggested that the commandment translated as "thou shalt not steal" was originally intended against stealing people—against abductions and slavery, in agreement with the Talmudic interpretation of the statement as "thou shalt not kidnap" (Sanhedrin 86a).

Idolatry

In Judaism there is a prohibition against making or worshipping an idol or a representation of God, but there is no restriction on art or simple depictions unrelated to God. Islam has a stronger prohibition, banning not just representations of God, but also in some cases of Muhammad, humans and, in some interpretations, any living creature.

In the non-canonical Gospel of Barnabas, it is claimed that Jesus stated that idolatry is the greatest sin as it divests a man fully of faith, and hence of God. The words attributed to Jesus prohibit not only worshipping statues of wood or stone; but also statues of flesh. "...all which a man loves, for which he leaves everything else but that, is his god, thus the glutton and drunkard has for his idol his own flesh, the fornicator has for his idol the harlot and the greedy has for his idol silver and gold, and so the same for every other sinner." Idolatory was thus the basic sin, which manifested in various acts or thoughts, which displace the primacy of God.  However, the Gospel of Barnabas does not form part of the Christian bible.  It is known only from 16th- and 17th-century manuscripts, and frequently reflects Islamic rather than Christian understandings.

Eastern Orthodox tradition teaches that while images of God, the Father, remain prohibited, depictions of Jesus as the incarnation of God as a visible human are permissible. To emphasize the theological importance of the incarnation, the Orthodox Church encourages the use of icons in church and private devotions, but prefers a two-dimensional depiction. In modern use (usually as a result of Roman Catholic influence), more naturalistic images and images of the Father, however, also appear occasionally in Orthodox churches, but statues, i.e. three-dimensional depictions, continue to be banned.

Adultery
This commandment forbade male Israelites from having sexual intercourse with the wife of another Israelite; the prohibition did not extend to their own slaves. Sexual intercourse between an Israelite man, married or not, and a woman who was neither married nor betrothed was not considered adultery. This concept of adultery stems from a society that was not strictly monogamous, where the patriarchal economic aspect of Israelite marriage gave the husband an exclusive right to his wife, whereas the wife, as the husband's possession, did not have an exclusive right to her husband.

Louis Ginzberg argued that the tenth commandment (Covet not thy neighbor's wife) is directed against a sin which may lead to a trespassing of all Ten Commandments.

Critical historical analysis

Early theories
Critical scholarship is divided over its interpretation of the ten commandment texts.

Julius Wellhausen's documentary hypothesis suggests that Exodus 20–23 and 34 "might be regarded as the document which formed the starting point of the religious history of Israel." Deuteronomy 5 then reflects King Josiah's attempt to link the document produced by his court to the older Mosaic tradition.

In a 2002 analysis of the history of this position, Bernard M. Levinson argued that this reconstruction assumes a Christian perspective, and dates back to Johann Wolfgang von Goethe's polemic against Judaism, which asserted that religions evolve from the more ritualistic to the more ethical. Goethe thus argued that the Ten Commandments revealed to Moses at Mount Sinai would have emphasized rituals, and that the "ethical" Decalogue Christians recite in their own churches was composed at a later date, when Israelite prophets had begun to prophesy the coming of the messiah. Levinson points out that there is no evidence, internal to the Hebrew Bible or in external sources, to support this conjecture. He concludes that its vogue among later critical historians represents the persistence of the idea that the supersession of Judaism by Christianity is part of a longer history of progress from the ritualistic to the ethical.

By the 1930s, historians who accepted the basic premises of multiple authorship had come to reject the idea of an orderly evolution of Israelite religion. Critics instead began to suppose that law and ritual could be of equal importance, while taking different form, at different times. This means that there is no longer any a priori reason to believe that Exodus 20:2–17 and Exodus 34:10–28 were composed during different stages of Israelite history. For example, critical historian John Bright also dates the Jahwist texts to the tenth century BC, but believes that they express a theology that "had already been normalized in the period of the Judges" (i.e., of the tribal alliance). He concurs about the importance of the decalogue as "a central feature in the covenant that brought together Israel into being as a people" but views the parallels between Exodus 20 and Deuteronomy 5, along with other evidence, as reason to believe that it is relatively close to its original form and Mosaic in origin.

Hittite treaties
According to John Bright, however, there is an important distinction between the Decalogue and the "book of the covenant" (Exodus 21–23 and 34:10–24). The Decalogue, he argues, was modelled on the suzerainty treaties of the Hittites (and other Mesopotamian Empires), that is, represents the relationship between God and Israel as a relationship between king and vassal, and enacts that bond.

"The prologue of the Hittite treaty reminds his vassals of his benevolent acts.. (compare with Exodus 20:2 "I am the  your God, who brought you out of the land of Egypt, out of the house of slavery"). The Hittite treaty also stipulated the obligations imposed by the ruler on his vassals, which included a prohibition of relations with peoples outside the empire, or enmity between those within." (Exodus 20:3: "You shall have no other gods before Me"). Viewed as a treaty rather than a law code, its purpose is not so much to regulate human affairs as to define the scope of the king's power.

Julius Morgenstern argued that Exodus 34 is distinct from the Jahwist document, identifying it with king Asa's reforms in 899 BC. Bright, however, believes that like the Decalogue this text has its origins in the time of the tribal alliance. The book of the covenant, he notes, bears a greater similarity to Mesopotamian law codes (e.g. the Code of Hammurabi which was inscribed on a stone stele). He argues that the function of this "book" is to move from the realm of treaty to the realm of law: "The Book of the Covenant (Ex., chs. 21 to 23; cf. ch. 34), which is no official state law, but a description of normative Israelite judicial procedure in the days of the Judges, is the best example of this process." According to Bright, then, this body of law too predates the monarchy.

Dating
Archaeologists Israel Finkelstein and Neil Asher Silberman argue that "the astonishing composition came together… in the seventh century BC". An even later date (after 586 BC) is suggested by David H. Aaron.

The Ritual Decalogue

Exodus 34:28 identifies a different list, that of Exodus 34:11–27, as the Ten Commandments. Since this passage does not prohibit murder, adultery, theft, etc., but instead deals with the proper worship of Yahweh, some scholars call it the "Ritual Decalogue", and disambiguate the Ten Commandments of traditional understanding as the "Ethical Decalogue".

Richard Elliott Friedman argues that the Ten Commandments at Exodus 20:1–17 "does not appear to belong to any of the major sources. It is likely to be an independent document, which was inserted here by the Redactor." In his view, the Covenant Code follows that version of the Ten Commandments in the northern Israel E narrative. In the J narrative in Exodus 34 the editor of the combined story known as the Redactor (or RJE), adds in an explanation that these are a replacement for the earlier tablets which were shattered. "In the combined JE text, it would be awkward to picture God just commanding Moses to make some tablets, as if there were no history to this matter, so RJE adds the explanation that these are a replacement for the earlier tablets that were shattered."

He writes that Exodus 34:14–26 is the J text of the Ten Commandments: "The first two commandments and the sabbath commandment have parallels in the other versions of the Ten Commandments. (Exodus 20 and Deuteronomy 5). … The other seven commandments here are completely different." He suggests that differences in the J and E versions of the Ten Commandments story are a result of power struggles in the priesthood. The writer has Moses smash the tablets "because this raised doubts about the Judah's central religious shrine".

According to Kaufmann, the Decalogue and the book of the covenant represent two ways of manifesting God's presence in Israel: the Ten Commandments taking the archaic and material form of stone tablets kept in the ark of the covenant, while the book of the covenant took oral form to be recited to the people.

Political importance

Several interpretations of the Commandments seem to have problems for modern people living in free societies, like capital punishment for blasphemy, idolatry, apostasy, adultery, cursing one own's parents, and Sabbath-breaking.

During an 1846 uprising, now known as the Galician slaughter, by impoverished and famished Galician Eastern European peasants (serfs) directed against szlachta (Polish nobles) because of their oppression (for example, manorial prisons), a popular rumor had it that the Austrian Emperor had abolished the Ten Commandants, which the peasants took as permission and religious justification to massacre the szlachta – the prime representatives and beneficiaries of the crown in Austrian Galicia. This uprising is credited with helping to bring on the demise, in 1848, of serfdom with corvée labor in Galicia.

United States debate over display on public property

European Protestants replaced some visual art in their churches with plaques of the Ten Commandments after the Reformation. In England, such "Decalogue boards" also represented the English monarch's emphasis on rule of royal law within the churches. The United States Constitution forbids establishment of religion by law; however images of Moses holding the tablets of the Decalogue, along other religious figures including Solomon, Confucius, and Muhammad holding the Quran, are sculpted on the north and south friezes of the pediment of the Supreme Court building in Washington. Images of the Ten Commandments have long been contested symbols for the relationship of religion to national law.

In the 1950s and 1960s the Fraternal Order of Eagles placed possibly thousands of Ten Commandments displays in courthouses and school rooms, including many stone monuments on courthouse property. Because displaying the commandments can reflect a sectarian position if they are numbered, the Eagles developed an ecumenical version that omitted the numbers, as on the monument at the Texas capitol. Hundreds of monuments were also placed by director Cecil B. DeMille as a publicity stunt to promote his 1956 film The Ten Commandments. Placing the plaques and monuments to the Ten Commandments in and around government buildings was another expression of mid-twentieth-century U.S. civil religion, along with adding the phrase "under God" to the Pledge of Allegiance.

By the beginning of the twenty-first century in the U.S., however, Decalogue monuments and plaques in government spaces had become a legal battleground between religious as well as political liberals and conservatives. Organizations such as the American Civil Liberties Union (ACLU) and Americans United for Separation of Church and State launched lawsuits challenging the posting of the ten commandments in public buildings. The ACLU has been supported by a number of religious groups (such as the Presbyterian Church (U.S.A.)). and the American Jewish Congress

One result of these legal cases has been that proponents of displaying the Ten Commandments have sometimes surrounded them with other historical texts to portray them as historical, rather than religious. Another result has been that other religious organizations have tried to put monuments to their laws on public lands. For example, an organization called Summum has won court cases against municipalities in Utah for refusing to allow the group to erect a monument of Summum aphorisms next to the Ten Commandments. The Summum aphorisms are officially known as the "Seven Aphorisms". Summum believes that when Moses came down from Mount Sinai the first time, he had the "Seven Aphorisms" on the Tablets of Stone but the undeveloped condition of the Israelites prevented them from understanding the Aphorisms and when Moses came down the second time, he brought down the Ten Commandments instead which were much easier for the Israelites to understand. Moses then shared the "Seven Aphorisms" with the few that could understand it which was then revealed by Summum. The cases were won on the grounds that Summum's right to freedom of speech was denied and the governments had engaged in discrimination. Instead of allowing Summum to erect its monument, the local governments chose to remove their Ten Commandments.

Cultural references
Two famous films with this name were directed by Cecil B. DeMille: a 1923 silent film which stars Theodore Roberts as Moses, and a 1956 version filmed in VistaVision starring Charlton Heston as Moses.

Both Dekalog, a 1989 Polish film series directed by Krzysztof Kieślowski, and The Ten, a 2007 American film, use the ten commandments as a structure for 10 smaller stories.

The receipt of the Ten Commandments by Moses was satirized in Mel Brooks's 1981 movie History of the World Part I, which shows Moses (played by Brooks, in a similar costume to Charlton Heston's Moses in the 1956 film), receiving three tablets containing fifteen commandments, but before he can present them to his people, he stumbles and drops one of the tablets, shattering it. He then presents the remaining tablets, proclaiming Ten Commandments.

See also

 Alternatives to the Ten Commandments – Secular and humanist alternatives to the biblical lists
 Code of Hammurabi (1772 BC)
 Code of Ur-Nammu (2050 BC)
 Divine command theory
 Five Precepts (Taoism)
 Five Precepts (Buddhism)
 Eight precepts (Buddhism)
 Maat, 42 confessions, 'The negative confession' (1500 BC) of the Papyrus of Ani, which is also known as The declaration of innocence before the Gods of the tribunal from The book of going forth by day, also Book of the Dead
 Nine Noble Virtues
 Seven deadly sins
 Seven Laws of Noah
 The Ten Commandments (2007 film)
 Ten Commandments of Computer Ethics
 Ten Conditions of Bai'at
 Yamas (Hinduism)

References

Further reading

 
  The Ten Commandments of God and The Lord's Prayer
 Peter Barenboim, Biblical Roots of Separation of Powers, Moscow, 2005, .
 

 
 
 
 
 
 Markl, Dominik (2012): "The Decalogue in History: A Preliminary Survey of the Fields and Genres of its Reception", in: Zeitschrift für Altorientalische und Biblische Rechtsgeschichte – vol. 18, nº., pp. 279–293, (pdf).

External links

 Ten Commandments: Ex. 20 version (text, mp3), Deut. 5 version (text, mp3) in The Hebrew Bible in English by Jewish Publication Society, 1917 ed.

 
Biblical phrases
Book of Deuteronomy
Book of Exodus
Biblical law
Codes of conduct
Commandments
Jewish ethics
Jewish law and rituals
Judeo-Christian topics
Moses
Mosaic law in Christian theology
Theophanies in the Hebrew Bible